HHF may refer to:

 HHF Architects, a Swiss architectural firm
 Haitian Health Foundation, an American relief organization
 Hamburg Freezers, a German ice hockey team
 Happy Hill Farm Academy Home, a private school in Texas, United States
 Hardest Hit Fund, a program of the United States Treasury
 Harmony Hall Fukui, a concert hall in Fukui, Japan
 Hearing Health Foundation, an American deafness organization
 Heinz-Harald Frentzen (born 1967), German racing driver